Lucas Chávez may refer to:

 Lucas Chaves Argentine footballer, born 1995 
 Lucas Chávez (volleyball) (born 1982)